Koda-ike is an earthfill dam located in Ehime Prefecture in Japan. The dam is used for irrigation. The catchment area of the dam is 0.9 km2. The dam impounds about 1  ha of land when full and can store 120 thousand cubic meters of water. The construction of the dam was completed in 1953.

References

Dams in Ehime Prefecture
1953 establishments in Japan